is a former model and a Japanese actress. She has appeared in more than 20 films since 2002.

Selected filmography

References

External links
 

1978 births
Living people
People from Chiba (city)
Japanese film actresses
Japanese television actresses